Olivier Keller (born March 20, 1971) is a former Swiss ice hockey player who played in the National League A for HC Fribourg-Gottéron, HC Lugano, EHC Basel and HC Genève-Servette. He represented the Switzerland men's national ice hockey team in the World Junior Ice Hockey Championships, World Championships, and Olympics.

Career statistics

Regular season and playoffs

International

External links

1971 births
Living people
Ice hockey people from Geneva
EHC Basel players
Genève-Servette HC players
HC Fribourg-Gottéron players
HC Lugano players
Ice hockey players at the 2002 Winter Olympics
Ice hockey players at the 2006 Winter Olympics
Lausanne HC players
Olympic ice hockey players of Switzerland
Swiss ice hockey defencemen